Valeriy Veshko (born 2 January 1966 in Volochysk, Ukrainian SSR) is a Soviet sprint canoeist who competed from the late 1980s to the early 1990s. He won nine medals at the ICF Canoe Sprint World Championships with seven golds (C-2 1000 m: 1987, C-4 500 m: 1989, 1990, 1991; C-4 1000 m: 1989, 1990, 1991), one silver (C-2 500 m: 1987), and one bronze (C-2 1000 m: 1989).

References

Living people
Soviet male canoeists
1966 births
People from Volochysk
Ukrainian male canoeists
ICF Canoe Sprint World Championships medalists in Canadian
Honoured Masters of Sport of the USSR
Sportspeople from Khmelnytskyi Oblast